Virgilio Fossati (3 January 1891 – 25 December 1916) was an Italian footballer and manager. A  midfielder, he played for and coached Italian club Inter Milan, also representing the Italy national team; he captained both teams throughout his career.

Career
Fossati spent his entire career with Inter Milan. He played 97 times for the club and scored 4 goals. Throughout his career, Fossati served as Inter and Italy's captain and also the first Inter player to play with the Italy national team. On 15 May 1910, he scored in Italy's first official match, a 6–2 win over France. He later also coached Inter.

Fossati's career was ended by World War I. He died on Christmas Day 1916 at Monfalcone during a battle between the Italian and Austrian armies.

His brother Giuseppe (born 1894) played 43 matches in three years with Inter.

References

External links
 

1891 births
1916 deaths
Italian footballers
Association football midfielders
Italy international footballers
Inter Milan players
Italian football managers
Inter Milan managers
Italian military personnel killed in World War I